Tromlyca is a genus of flowering plants belonging to the family Rubiaceae.

Its native range is Colombia.

Species:
 Tromlyca locellata (C.M.Taylor) Borhidi

References

Rubiaceae
Rubiaceae genera